The 1997 MTV Movie Awards were held on June 10, 1997, and hosted by Mike Myers. Performers included Jewel, Bush, and En Vogue. This year also eliminated the categories of "Most Desirable Female" and "Most Desirable Male."

Performers
Bush — "Cold Contagious"
Jewel — "Foolish Games"
En Vogue — "Whatever"
The Wondermints (Austin Powers Band) — "BBC"

Presenters
Elle Macpherson and Chris O'Donnell — presented Breakthrough Performance
Dylan McDermott and Gillian Anderson — presented Best Action Sequence
Cameron Diaz and Ewan McGregor — presented Best Kiss
Michael Keaton and Salma Hayek — presented Best Villain
Bill Bellamy and Ashley Judd — presented Best On-Screen Duo
Renée Zellweger — introduced Jewel
Toni Braxton — presented Best Song from a Movie
Mike Myers — presented the Lifetime Achievement Award
Ellen Barkin — presented Best New Filmmaker
Alicia Silverstone — presented Best Comedic Performance
David Spade and Hanson — presented Best Fight
Puff Daddy — introduced En Vogue
Gwen Stefani and Neve Campbell — presented Best Male Performance
Will Smith — presented Best Female Performance
Samuel L. Jackson and Mira Sorvino — presented Best Movie

Awards

Best Movie 
Scream
Independence Day
Jerry Maguire
The Rock
Romeo + Juliet

Best Male Performance 
Tom Cruise – Jerry Maguire
Leonardo DiCaprio – Romeo + Juliet
Eddie Murphy – The Nutty Professor
Will Smith – Independence Day
John Travolta – Phenomenon

Best Female Performance 
Claire Danes – Romeo + Juliet
Sandra Bullock – A Time to Kill
Neve Campbell – Scream
Helen Hunt – Twister
Madonna – Evita

Breakthrough Performance 
Matthew McConaughey – A Time To Kill
Vivica A. Fox – Independence Day
Courtney Love – The People vs. Larry Flynt
Ewan McGregor – Trainspotting
Renée Zellweger – Jerry Maguire

Best On-Screen Duo 
Nicolas Cage and Sean Connery – The Rock
Beavis and Butt-head – Beavis and Butt-head Do America
Steve Buscemi and Peter Stormare – Fargo
Claire Danes and Leonardo DiCaprio – Romeo + Juliet
Nathan Lane and Robin Williams – The Birdcage

Best Villain 
Jim Carrey – The Cable Guy
Robert De Niro – The Fan
Kiefer Sutherland – A Time To Kill
Edward Norton – Primal Fear
Mark Wahlberg – Fear

Best Comedic Performance 
Jim Carrey – The Cable Guy
Chris Farley – Beverly Hills Ninja
Janeane Garofalo – The Truth About Cats & Dogs
Eddie Murphy – The Nutty Professor
Robin Williams – The Birdcage

Best Song from a Movie 
Bush — "Machinehead" (from Fear)
Eric Clapton and Babyface — "Change the World" (from Phenomenon)
Garbage — "#1 Crush" (from Romeo + Juliet)
Madonna — "Don't Cry for Me, Argentina" (from Evita)
R. Kelly  — "I Believe I Can Fly" (from Space Jam)

Best Kiss 
Vivica A. Fox and Will Smith – Independence Day
Claire Danes and Leonardo DiCaprio – Romeo + Juliet
Gina Gershon and Jennifer Tilly – Bound
Kyra Sedgwick and John Travolta – Phenomenon
Christine Taylor and Christopher Daniel Barnes – A Very Brady Sequel

Best Action Sequence 
Truck Drives Through Farm Equipment – Twister
Arnold Schwarzenegger Freefalls – Eraser
Aliens Blow Up Cities – Independence Day
Train/Helicopter Chase – Mission: Impossible
Ferrari Chase Through San Francisco – The Rock

Best Fight 
Fairuza Balk vs. Robin Tunney – The Craft
Matthew Broderick vs. Jim Carrey – The Cable Guy
Jim Brown vs. Alien – Mars Attacks!
Jackie Chan vs. Ladder – Police Story 4: First Strike
Pamela Anderson Lee vs. Bad Guy – Barb Wire

Best New Filmmaker 
Doug Liman – Swingers

Lifetime Achievement Award 
Chewbacca – Star Wars Episode IV: A New Hope, The Empire Strikes Back, and Return of the Jedi

External links
MTV winners list
MTV Movie Awards: 1997  at the Internet Movie Database
List of nominees and winners of 1997 MTV Movie Awards

 1997
Mtv Movie Awards
MTV Movie Awards
20th century in Los Angeles
1997 in American cinema